is a quarter of Hamburg, Germany, in the borough of Wandsbek. It is located on the northern boundaries of the borough and of the city. It is part of the area of Walddörfer (lit. forest villages).

Geography
Duvenstedt borders the quarters of Lemsahl-Mellingstedt and Wohldorf-Ohlstedt. The Alster river and the Diekbek stream flow through Duvenstedt. The nature reserve of Duvenstedter Brook is named after the former village, but is located in neighbouring Wohldorf-Ohlstedt.

History
In 1261 Duvenstedt, formerly a Saxonian Rundling, was first recorded. It is named after a founder called Duvo. Also the part -stedt in the name refers to a Saxonian foundation, meaning safe settlement or safe residence. In 1937, the village was incorporated into Hamburg by the Greater Hamburg Act, which came into force in 1938.

Politics
These are the results of Duvenstedt in the Hamburg state election:

References

External links

 Duvenstedt, Hamburg.de

Quarters of Hamburg
Wandsbek